Mockingjay is a 2010 novel by Suzanne Collins.

Mockingjay may also refer to:
The Hunger Games: Mockingjay – Part 1 (2014), the first half of a two-part film adaptation of the novel
The Hunger Games: Mockingjay – Part 2 (2015), the second half of a two-part film adaptation of the novel
Katniss Everdeen or the Mockingjay, the protagonist of the Hunger Games trilogy
Mockingjays, a fictional bird species in the Hunger Games universe
Mockingjay, a cache replacement policy

See also
 Mockingbird (disambiguation)